Stanislav Yegorshev (born September 21, 1987) is a Russian professional ice hockey defenceman who is currently an unrestricted free agent. He most recently played for Avtomobilist Yekaterinburg in the Kontinental Hockey League (KHL). He has previously played the majority of his professional career with fellow Russian club, HC Severstal of the KHL.

References

External links

1987 births
Living people
Avangard Omsk players
Avtomobilist Yekaterinburg players
HC CSKA Moscow players
Russian ice hockey defencemen
Severstal Cherepovets players
Torpedo Nizhny Novgorod players